Jogal Kasti is a big cty state|Karnataka]], India. It is located 10 km from Mulbagal along the V Kota road to Tayalur. It is about 15 km from the border of Andhra Pradesh. 17 km north of the village are the Kolar Gold Fields. Before the post of tahasildar was carved by the government of Karnataka in 1983, Jogal Kasti was headed by Haji K . M Abdul Jabbar, as the patel, and was popularly known as " Patel Sab " or " Gowdru ". Jogal Kasti is noted for its mango farms - it produces the highest amount of mangoes in India - and its red chili production.

This village has the highest literacy rate in Karnataka. It also has well-educated officials working in various departments in the Karnataka state government service.

Culture
Avani hobli near Mulbagal is known as the Gaya of the southern India and bears a cluster of temples such as the Rameshwara, Bharateshwara, Lakshmaneshwara and Shatrugneshwara, dating back to period of the Nolamba dynasty. 

Villages in Kolar district